Manuel Giúdice (15 July 1918 – 27 June 1983) was an Argentine football player and manager. He is mainly known for his successful managing spell at the helm of the Argentine powerhouse Club Atlético Independiente in the mid-1960s.

Career
Born in Córdoba, Giúdice first started playing at several clubs in his home town. In 1939 he transferred to the Buenos Aires-based Club Atlético Huracán and joined a team that featured Emilio Baldonedo, Herminio Masantonio, and Carlos Marinelli and that finished third in the 1939 Argentine top level season. The same team won the Copa Adrián C. Escobar in 1942 and 1943 and the George VI British Competition Cup in 1944.

In 1945 Giúdice joined River Plate, with players such as Aristóbulo Deambrosi, Alfredo Di Stéfano, José Manuel Moreno, and Ángel Labruna. River Plate won the Argentine championship in 1945.

In 1947 he left River Plate to join Club Atlético Platense, but following a 1948 players' strike, which forced many of the great figures of Argentine football to emigrate to other countries, Giúdice moved on to Colombia and signed for Deportivo Cali in 1949. He ended his playing career in 1951.

He then turned to coaching and successfully managed Independiente, leading them national league titles in 1963 and 1970. In 1968, he led Vélez Sarsfield to the Argentine championship; it was the club's first national title. His greatest success was winning the 1964 and 1965 Copa Libertadores cups, also finishing as runners-up in the 1964 and 1964 Intercontinental Cups, losing both times to Inter Milan, at the time coached by fellow Argentine Helenio Herrera.

In his later years he coached Nueva Chicago and Atlético Tucumán in the Argentine second level.

Honours

As a player
River Plate
 Argentine Primera División: 1945

As a manager
Independiente
 Argentine Primera División: 1963
 Copa Libertadores: 1964, 1965

Vélez Sarsfield
 Argentine Primera División: 1968

References

1918 births
1983 deaths
Argentine expatriate sportspeople in Colombia
Argentine footballers
Argentine football managers
Argentine Primera División players
Categoría Primera A players
Club Atlético Huracán footballers
Club Atlético River Plate footballers
Club Atlético Platense footballers
Deportivo Cali footballers
Argentine expatriate footballers
Expatriate footballers in Colombia
Club Atlético Huracán managers
Club Atlético Independiente managers
Rosario Central managers
Club Atlético Vélez Sarsfield managers
Association football midfielders
Footballers from Córdoba, Argentina
Atlético Tucumán managers